Wil was a municipality in the district of Laufenburg in the canton of Aargau in Switzerland. The municipality is located in the north-east of the Fricktal region, about 3 km from the border to Germany.  On 1 January 2010 the municipalities of Hottwil, Etzgen, Mettau, Oberhofen and Wil merged into the municipality of Mettauertal.

Population

Current population is 669 inhabitants.

References

Former municipalities of Aargau
Populated places disestablished in 2010